The following list of Carnegie libraries in Georgia provides detailed information on United States Carnegie libraries in Georgia, where 24 public libraries were built from 20 grants (totaling $503,756) awarded by the Carnegie Corporation of New York from 1898 to 1914. In addition, academic libraries were built at five institutions (totaling $110,000).

Key

Public libraries

Academic libraries

Notes

References

Note: The above references, while all authoritative, are not entirely mutually consistent. Some details of this list may have been drawn from one of the references (usually Jones) without support from the others.  Reader discretion is advised.

Georgia
 
Libraries
Libraries